The 2022 Libera Awards was held on June 16, 2022, to recognize the best in independent music presented by the American Association of Independent Music. The ceremony streamed live on YouTube.

The nominations were announced on March 23, 2022, led by indie pop band Japanese Breakfast with seven. New award categories, Self-Released Record of the Year and Best Pop Record, were added. The Best Dance/Electronic Record category was divided into two categories: Best Dance Record and Best Electronic Record, bringing the total number of categories to 36. The Best Metal Record was renamed Best Heavy Record.

The awards ceremony took place on June 16, 2022, held in New York City at Webster Hall. With four awards, Japanese Breakfast was the most awarded artist.

Winners and nominees 
{| class="wikitable" style="width:95%"
|- bgcolor="#bebebe"
! width="50%" |Record of the Year
! width="50%" |Self-Released Record of the Year
|-
| valign="top" |Jubilee – Japanese BreakfastCollapsed in Sunbeams – Arlo Parks
Georgia Blue – Jason Isbell and the 400 Unit
Hey What – Low
New Long Leg – Dry Cleaning
Valentine – Snail Mail
| valign="top" |Deadpan Love – Cautious ClayHalf God – Wiki
A New Child – Jackson Wooten
Ready Is Always Too Late – Sinéad Harnett
Rebecca Black Was Here – Rebecca Black
Yellow – Emma-Jean Thackray
|-
! width="50%" |A2IM Humanitarian Award
! width="50%" |Best Alternative Rock Record
|-
| valign="top" |Common for work with A Rebirth of SoundMargo Price for work with Farm Aid
Recording Artists and Music Professionals with Disabilities (RAMPD)
Rev. Moose for work with National Independent Venue Association (NIVA)
Secretly Group – SC25 - Every Light On This Side of The Town
Hopeless Records / Sub City Records – Songs That Saved My Life
| valign="top" |Jubilee – Japanese BreakfastHEY WHAT – Low
If I Could Make It Go Quiet – Girl in Red
New Long Leg – Dry Cleaning
Things Take Time, Take Time – Courtney Barnett
Valentine – Snail Mail
"Wildfire" – Cautious Clay
|-
! width="50%" |Best Americana Record
! width="50%" |Best Blues Record
|-
| valign="top" |History of a Feeling – Madi DiazAnother Side – Leo Nocentelli
Georgia Blue – Jason Isbell and the 400 Unit
Leftover Feelings – John Hiatt with The Jerry Douglas Band
Other You – Steve Gunn
The Pet Parade – Fruit Bats
Quietly Blowing It – Hiss Golden Messenger
| valign="top" |662 – Christone "Kingfish" IngramI Be Trying – Cedric Burnside"Can't Stop the Rain" – Neal Francis
Dear America – Eric Bibb
Promenade Blue – Nick Waterhouse
Rose-Colored Glasses, Vol. 1 – Teresa James & the Rhythm Tramps
|-
! width="50%" |Best Classical Record
! width="50%" |Best Country Record
|-
| valign="top" |Impermanence/Disintegration – Bryce Dessner, Australian String Quartet and Sydney Dance CompanyAll the Unknown – Grandbrothers
Canadiana – Canadian Brass
Our Flashback Wedding – Vitamin String Quartet
Piano Piano – Jeremiah Fraites
Sunbathing Through a Glass Screen – Theo Alexander
| valign="top" |The Ballad of Dood and Juanita – Sturgill SimpsonAmerican Siren – Emily Scott Robinson
Own Side Now (Deluxe Anniversary Edition) – Caitlin Rose
Reckless – Morgan Wade
Sayin' What I'm Thinkin' – Lainey Wilson
Southern Curiosity – Fancy Hagood
|-
! width="50%" |Best Dance Record
! width="50%" |Best Electronic Record
|-
| valign="top" |Loving in Stereo – JungleDJ-Kicks: Disclosure – Disclosure
"Loose Your Mind" – Dawn Richard
"Original Classic" – Keys N Krates
"Stay High again.." (Fred again.. & Joy Anonymous Remix) – Brittany Howard
You've Got the Whole Night to Go – Logic1000
| valign="top" |Before I Die – 박혜진 Park Hye JinKick III – Arca
Second Line – Dawn Richard
Yasuke – Flying Lotus
"You Can Do It" – Caribou
|-
! width="50%" |Best Folk/Bluegrass Record
! width="50%" |Best Heavy Record
|-
| valign="top" |Fun House – Hand HabitsLocal Valley – José GonzálezBroken Hearts & Dirty Windows: Songs of John Prine, Vol. 2 – Various artists
Geist – Shannon Lay
Ignorance – The Weather Station
The Way Back Home – Aisha Badru
| valign="top" |Infinite Granite – Deafheaven10 Babymetal Budokan – Babymetal
Distant Populations – Quicksand
Eternal Blue – Spiritbox
Radical – Every Time I Die
|-
! width="50%" |Best Hip-Hop/Rap Record
! width="50%" |Best Jazz Record
|-
| valign="top" |Sometimes I Might Be Introvert – Little SimzBroken Hearts and Beauty Sleep – Mykki Blanco
By the Time I Get to Phoenix – Injury Reserve
Elephant in the Room – Mick Jenkins
Off the Yak – Young M.A
"Your Heart" – Joyner Lucas & J. Cole
| valign="top" |Talk Memory – BadBadNotGoodThe American Negro – Adrian Younge
Daring Mind – Jihye Lee Orchestra
"Qadir" (BadBadNotGood Remix) – Nick Hakim
Septet – John Carroll Kirby
Space 1.8 – Nala Sinephro
|-
! width="50%" |Best Latin Record
! width="50%" |Best Outlier Record
|-
| valign="top" |Far In – Helado NegroEl Alimento – Cimafunk
Kick II – Arca
La Cruzada – Alejandro Escovedo
Looking Back – Los Retros
Una Rosa – Xenia Rubinos
| valign="top" |Fatigue – L'RainBlack Encyclopedia of the Air – Moor Mother
Inside (The Songs) – Bo Burnham
Colourgrade – Tirzah
Entertainment, Death – Spirit of the Beehive
|-
! width="50%" |Best Pop Record
! width="50%" |Best Punk Record
|-
| valign="top" |Collapsed in Sunbeams – Arlo ParksAshlyn – Ashe
How Long Do You Think It's Gonna Last? – Big Red Machine
KIDS – Noga Erez
WINK – CHAI
| valign="top" |"Racist, Sexist Boy" (Live at Los Angeles Public Library) – The Linda LindasComfort to Me – Amyl and the Sniffers
Let Me Do One More – Illuminati Hotties
The Mutt's Nuts – Chubby and the Gang
Spare Ribs – Sleaford Mods
|-
! width="50%" |Best R&B Record
! width="50%" |Best Re-Issue
|-
| valign="top" |Mood Valiant – Hiatus KaiyoteAlpha – Charlotte Day Wilson
Deacon – Serpentwithfeet
Jaime (Reimagined) – Brittany Howard
Last Year Was Weird, Vol. 3 – Tkay Maidza
Private Space – Durand Jones & The Indications
| valign="top" |Kid A Mnesia – Radiohead77-81 – Gang of Four
Buena Vista Social Club (25th Anniversary Edition) – Buena Vista Social Club
The Golden Age of Apocalypse (Ten Year Anniversary Edition – Thundercat
The Good, the Bad, and the Funky – Tom Tom Club
Ladies and Gentlemen We Are Floating in Space – Spiritualized
|-
! width="50%" |Best Rock Record
! width="50%" |Best Spiritual Record
|-
| valign="top" |Crawler – IdlesCapitol Cuts (Live at Studio A) – Black Pumas
The Comeback Special – The The
Drunk Tank Pink – Shame
Sympathy for Life – Parquet Courts
| valign="top" |"I Wish I Knew How It Would Feel To Be Free" – The Blind Boys of Alabama featuring Béla Fleck"Don't Worry Bout It" – Wande featuring Porsha Love
Front Porch Singin – The Oak Ridge Boys
Mercy – Natalie Bergman
O Come, All Ye Faithful – Hiss Golden Messenger
|-
! width="50%" |Best Sync Usage
! width="50%" |Best World Record
|-
| valign="top" |"I Know the End" – Phoebe Bridgers for Mare of Easttown (Episode 6)"Caravan of Fools" – John Prine for Yellowstone (Season 4, Episode 3)
"Chaise Longue" – Wet Leg for Gossip Girl (Season 1, Episode 5)
"Colors" – Black Pumas for the Concrete Cowboy trailer
"Hello" – Adele for NFL/Tom Brady's Return
"She's a Rainbow" – The Rolling Stones for Ted Lasso (Season 2, Episode 5)
"Zombie" – Fela Kuti for the Gucci 100 promo campaign
| valign="top" |Afrique Victime – Mdou MoctarJoão Donato JID007 – João Donato
Legacy+ – Femi Kuti and Made Kuti
The Return of Pachyman – Pachyman
Yol – Altın Gün
|-
! width="50%" |Breakthrough Artist/Release
! width="50%" |Creative Packaging
|-
| valign="top" |Wet Leg – "Chaise Longue"Black Country, New Road – For the First Time
Girl in Red – If I Could Make It Go Quiet
Japanese Breakfast – Jubilee
Mdou Moctar – Afrique Victime
| valign="top" |Japanese Breakfast – Jubilee
Buzzcocks – Complete UA Singles 1977-1980
Erroll Garner – Liberation in Swing: Centennial Collection
Fela Kuti – Box Set #5 Co-Curated by Chris Martin & Femi Kuti
Gang of Four – 77-81
Gary Numan – 45x15 The Singles Collection 1978-1983
|-
! width="50%" |Independent Champion
! width="50%" |Label of the Year (Big)
|-
| valign="top" |BandcampFUGA
Light in the Attic Distribution
Redeye Worldwide
SoundExchange
| valign="top" |Matador RecordsMom + Pop MusicATO Records
Merge Records
Ninja Tune
Polyvinyl Record Co.
Third Man Records
|-
! width="50%" |Label of the Year (Medium)
! width="50%" |Label of the Year (Small)
|-
| valign="top" |Sacred Bones RecordsCity Slang
Hopeless Records
New West Records
Saddle Creek Records
Yep Roc Records
| valign="top" |Oh Boy RecordsDon Giovanni Records
Innovative Leisure
Sargent House
Sundazed Records
|-
! width="50%" |Marketing Genius
! width="50%" |Video of the Year
|-
| valign="top" |Japanese Breakfast (Dead Oceans) – Jubilee''Bicep (Ninja Tune) – Isles
Death Row Records – Death Row Records 30th Anniversary
Eyedress (Lex Records) – Mulholland Drive
Helado Negro (4AD) – Helado Negro Ice Cream Tricycle
King Gizzard & the Lizard Wizard (ATO Records) – Official Bootlegger Series
| valign="top" |Wet Leg – "Chaise Longue"Danny Elfman – "True"
Idles – "Car Crash"
Japanese Breakfast – "Savage Good Boy"
Sharon Van Etten & Angel Olsen – "Like I Used To"
Yves Tumor – "Jackie"
|-
! width="50%" |Best Live/Livestream Act
! width="50%" | Special awards
|-
| valign="top" |Mdou Moctar – Live at the Niger RiverAmyl and the Sniffers – Live on KEXP at Home
Black Pumas – "Colors" at Celebrating America
Japanese Breakfast – "Be Sweet" at The Tonight Show Starring Jimmy Fallon
Jason Isbell and the 400 Unit – "Driver 8" Live from Athens, Georgia
St. Vincent – "At the Holiday Party" at the Austin City Limits Music Festival
| valign="top" |Excellence in advocacy – Dionne Warwick Congressional independent music guardian – Congresswoman Linda Sánchez (D-CA)Innovation in sustainability – IMPALA Sustainability Task Force|}

 Multiple nominations 
Nominees with more than two nominations.ArtistsRecord labels'''

References

External links
Official website

Libera Awards
2022 music awards